Amphonyx kofleri is a moth of the  family Sphingidae. It is found in the Dominican Republic.

References

Amphonyx
Moths described in 2006
Moths of the Caribbean